Tom Chamberlain may refer to:

Tom Chamberlain (footballer, born 1996), English footballer for Selby Town
Tom Chamberlain (footballer, born 2002), English footballer for Cheltenham Town
Tom Chamberlain (rugby union) (born 1987), New Zealand rugby union player

See also
Thomas Chamberlain (disambiguation)